Gymnopilus echinulisporus is a species of agaric fungus in the family Hymenogastraceae. It was first formally described by American mycologist William Alphonso Murrill in 1912.

Description

Habitat and distribution
Gymnopilus echinulisporus has been found growing on wood in Oregon in November.

See also

 List of Gymnopilus species

References

External links
Images at Mushroom Observer

echinulisporus
Fungi described in 1912
Fungi of North America
Taxa named by William Alphonso Murrill